Umwani is a genus of East African araneomorph spiders in the family Cyatholipidae, and was first described by C. E. Griswold in 2001.  it contains only two species: U. anymphos and U. artigamos.

References

Araneomorphae genera
Cyatholipidae
Spiders of Africa